Bell Block is a town in Taranaki, New Zealand. State Highway 3 runs through it. It is 6 km north-east of the centre of New Plymouth and 1 km from the outer edge of New Plymouth at Waiwhakaiho. Waitara is about 9 km to the north-east. New Plymouth Airport is located immediately to the north-east of Bell Block.

History and culture

The land was purchased in November 1848 by Dillon Bell from the Puketapu iwi. The initial purchase was  but more land was added subsequently. Disagreements over the sale of the land contributed to the First Taranaki War. A blockhouse was built by local settlers in early 1860, in order to protect their homes and farms during heightened tensions just prior to the advent of the First Taranaki War. When government troops arrived, a full stockade was built at the site, known as Bell Block Stockade, Bell Blockhouse or Hua Blockhouse. During this time, almost all Bell Block residents took refuge at New Plymouth. Some of the earthworks continued until 1972 when a hotel was built on the site.

Much of New Plymouth's heavy and medium industry is situated around Bell Block, which led to heavy traffic congestion. Construction of an arterial bypass of the town commenced in late 2006. A previously unknown Māori Pā site was discovered during site investigations and was excavated by archaeologists prior to construction.

Marae

Muru Raupatu marae and meeting house is a meeting place for the Puketapu hapū.

In October 2020, the Government committed $817,845 from the Provincial Growth Fund to upgrade it and Te Kohanga Moa marae, creating 15 jobs.

Demographics

Bell Block had a population of 7,041 at the 2018 New Zealand census, an increase of 1,182 people (20.2%) since the 2013 census, and an increase of 2,463 people (53.8%) since the 2006 census. There were 2,454 households, comprising 3,420 males and 3,624 females, giving a sex ratio of 0.94 males per female, with 1,476 people (21.0%) aged under 15 years, 1,386 (19.7%) aged 15 to 29, 2,961 (42.1%) aged 30 to 64, and 1,215 (17.3%) aged 65 or older.

Ethnicities were 79.6% European/Pākehā, 18.3% Māori, 3.8% Pacific peoples, 10.7% Asian, and 2.1% other ethnicities. People may identify with more than one ethnicity.

The percentage of people born overseas was 20.4, compared with 27.1% nationally.

Although some people chose not to answer the census's question about religious affiliation, 49.5% had no religion, 37.3% were Christian, 0.8% had Māori religious beliefs, 2.4% were Hindu, 0.7% were Muslim, 0.7% were Buddhist and 1.9% had other religions.

Of those at least 15 years old, 804 (14.4%) people had a bachelor's or higher degree, and 1,254 (22.5%) people had no formal qualifications. 915 people (16.4%) earned over $70,000 compared to 17.2% nationally. The employment status of those at least 15 was that 2,649 (47.6%) people were employed full-time, 792 (14.2%) were part-time, and 210 (3.8%) were unemployed.

Features and attractions

The Waipu Lagoons are North Taranaki's only wetland area. The lagoons are home to a variety of wildlife, and are an important natural home for the endangered Australasian bittern.

In December 2014 the northern end of New Plymouth's coastal walkway was extended from Hickford Park, Bell Block through to Tirimoana Crescent, making it possible to cycle or walk from Bell Block into central New Plymouth.

The construction of Taranaki's first world-class BMX facility began in Bell Block in July 2015 and was completed in early 2016.

The BMX track is the latest addition to the Bell Block cycle park, which includes a 1.75 km closed road circuit with two separate 1 km loops and a 333-meter velodrome. The cycle park also has a collection of tracks for children including a miniature town route with traffic lights, a roundabout, railway crossing, accessible car parks, pedestrian crossing and speed bumps, all scaled down to 60 per cent of the original size, to help teach children safety while cycling.

Education
The present school dates from 1872. Puketapu School was built in 1980.

Notes

Further reading

General historical works

Clubs and organisations

Maori

New Zealand Wars

Schools

External links
 Bell Block School website
 Puketapu School website

Populated places in Taranaki
New Plymouth District
Black sand beaches